The Samanala Dam (Sinhala: සමනලවැව වේල්ල) is a dam primarily used for hydroelectric power generation in Sri Lanka. Commissioned in 1992, the Samanalawewa Project (Samanala Reservoir Project) is the third-largest hydroelectric scheme in the country, producing 405 GWh of energy annually. It was built with financial support from Japan and the United Kingdom. It is notable for a large leak on its right bank. Power production continues as planned despite the leakage, and the water from the leak now provides two thirds of the water issued by the reservoir for agriculture in downstream areas.

Location 
The Samanala Dam is located in the Uda Walawe basin. The ground of the project area is karstic.

Background and development 

With the Mahaweli and Laxapana hydroelectric power projects implemented, the demand for electricity in Sri Lanka rapidly increased. When it became clear that it would not be possible to meet the demand with coal-fired power plants, the government of Sri Lanka decided to initiate another hydroelectric power project. A reservoir type hydroelectric power plant was planned to be constructed across the Walawe river, which would address the shortage of electricity in the country. Detailed investigations for a hydroelectric power plant in this area have been carried out since 1958, but the scheme was initiated only in 1986. The financing for the project was given by the governments of Japan and the United Kingdom.

Sir Alexander Gibb & Partners did the design work and Balfour Beatty were the contracts to lay roads, drive a tunnel and build the power station.

The cost of the project was estimated to be 60,176 million yen, but with the remedial measures taken to control the leak, the cost increased to 74,313 million yen. The Samanalawewa power plant was commissioned in 1992. The Samanalawewa project is the second largest hydroelectric scheme in Sri Lanka after the Mahaweli project.

Dam, reservoir and the power station 

The dam is of rock fill, central earth core type.

The reservoir is u-shaped. It covers an area of 897 ha. It is one of the largest reservoirs in Sri Lanka.

The power house contains two Francis turbines, each with a capacity of 62 MW, and generates 405 GWh of energy annually. The powerplant is managed by the Ceylon Electricity Board.

Leak 

A permeable area of ground was found during the construction of the dam in 1988. Curtain grouting was used in an effort to remedy this. Subsequent measures taken to control the leakage were largely ineffective.

The leak is constantly monitored. If the leak remains stable and does not increase further, it does not pose a threat to the sustainability of the project. The karstic ground has created complex geological conditions, and as a result the exact mechanism of the leak cannot be established, so remedial measures have been unsuccessful.

Impact 
The project was planned as a single purpose hydropower project. Therefore, the effects on the agriculture and the environment of the area were taken into consideration very little during the development. Although an irrigational release valve (IRV) is there in the dam to supply water to the farmlands in the downstream areas, the yield and cultivable acreage has declined since the Samanalawewa project was commissioned.

However, the necessity to constantly release water for agriculture in the downstream areas was reduced due to the leak. Of the water released from the Samanala Dam for agriculture in the downstream areas, two-thirds is from the leak and only one-third has to be supplied via the IRV.

See also 
 List of dams and reservoirs in Sri Lanka
 List of power stations in Sri Lanka

References 

Hydroelectric power stations in Sri Lanka
Dams in Sri Lanka
Buildings and structures in Sabaragamuwa Province
Dams completed in 1992
Embankment dams